The sooty-headed tyrannulet (Phyllomyias griseiceps) is a species of bird in the family Tyrannidae. It is found in Brazil, Colombia, Ecuador, Guyana, Panama, Peru, and Venezuela.

Its natural habitats are subtropical or tropical dry forests, subtropical or tropical moist lowland forests, and heavily degraded former forest.

Gallery

References

sooty-headed tyrannulet
Birds of Colombia
Birds of Venezuela
Birds of Ecuador
Birds of Peru
Birds of the Guianas
Birds of the Amazon Basin
sooty-headed tyrannulet
sooty-headed tyrannulet]
sooty-headed tyrannulet
Taxonomy articles created by Polbot